An American in Canada is a Canadian television sitcom that aired on CBC Television in 2003 and 2004.

The show starred Rick Roberts as Jake Crewe, an American television news host who was forced, after beating up his station manager, to accept a job in Calgary, Alberta as co-host of the lowest-rated morning news program in the city. The show found its comedy in Crewe's attempts to adapt to Canadian culture, as well as his interactions with coworkers such as producer and love interest Judy Surgick (Hélène Joy) and egotistical host Dennis McIlvane (Stewart Francis).

An American in Canada was loosely based on the real-life experiences of Jebb Fink, an American comedian who moved to Canada after marrying a Canadian woman, and did become a morning television host on CKAL-TV, Calgary's A-Channel station. It was created by Fink and Howard Busgang.

The show's pilot aired as a special in January 2002 as part of the CBC's early-2000s strategy of airing comedy pilots to test viewer reaction before ordering the production of a full series. Viewer reaction was overwhelmingly positive, and the series went into production and premiered in 2003. The show produced 16 episodes over two seasons before being cancelled in 2004.

The program won the Gemini Award for Best Comedy Program or Series at the 17th Gemini Awards.

It has also aired on Australia's The Comedy Channel with the title Frostbite, and in syndication on Showcase in Canada and HDNet in the USA.

Cast
 Rick Roberts - Jake Crewe
 Hélène Joy - Judy Surgick
 Stewart Francis - Dennis Macilvane
 Timm Zemanek - Bill Robinson
 Matthew Ferguson - Derrick
 Robin Brûlé - Mara
 Sugith Varughese - Aftab

Episode list

Season 1

Season 2

References

External links

2000s Canadian sitcoms
2000s Canadian workplace comedy television series
2003 Canadian television series debuts
2004 Canadian television series endings
CBC Television original programming
Television shows set in Calgary
Television news sitcoms
Television series by S&S Productions
Gemini and Canadian Screen Award for Best Comedy Series winners